Hot R&B/Hip-Hop Songs is a chart published by Billboard that ranks the top-performing songs in the United States in African-American-oriented musical genres; the chart has undergone various name changes since its launch in 1942 to reflect the evolution of such genres.  In 1968, it was published under the title Top Selling R&B Singles in the issue dated January 6, Best Selling R&B Singles through the issue dated March 30, and Best Selling Rhythm & Blues Singles thereafter.  During that year, 20 different singles topped the chart, based on playlists submitted by radio stations and surveys of retail sales outlets.

Unusually, the year started and ended with different versions of the same song at number one.  In the issue of Billboard dated January 6, Gladys Knight & the Pips were at number one with "I Heard It Through the Grapevine", the song's sixth week in the top spot.  In December, Marvin Gaye's version of the song reached number one and held the peak position for the final three weeks of the year.  Gaye had actually recorded his version before Knight recorded hers, but Berry Gordy, owner of the Motown record label, refused to allow it to be released.  After Knight's version became a success, Gaye's version was included on his album In the Groove and was released as a single by popular demand.  It ultimately outperformed Knight's version, becoming Motown's biggest-selling single to date, and has come to be regarded as the definitive version of the song.  It was Gaye's third chart-topper of 1968, following "Ain't Nothing Like the Real Thing" and "You're All I Need to Get By", both duets with Tammi Terrell.

In March, Otis Redding reached number one with his song "(Sittin' on) the Dock of the Bay", which spent three weeks in the top spot.  Redding had died in a plane crash in December of the previous year just days after recording the track, and the song, which also topped the all-genre Hot 100 chart, was the first posthumous number one in the history of that listing.  "Tighten Up" by Archie Bell & the Drells, "Grazing in the Grass" by Hugh Masekela and Gaye's version of "I Heard It Through the Grapevine" also topped both charts in 1968.  Redding, Bell & the Drells and Masekela all topped the R&B chart in 1968 for the first time, as did Tammi Terell, the Intruders, the Dells and Johnnie Taylor.  The Dells have been inducted into the Rock and Roll Hall of Fame in recognition of their long and successful career, and the Intruders are considered to have been an early influence on the Philadelphia soul sound, which grew in prominence in the 1970s.

Chart history

References

1968
1968 record charts
1968 in American music